Harutyun Vapurciyan is a Turkish architect of Armenian origin.

One of his most important of the designs that he implemented alongside architects such as Greek architect Avyerinos Andonyadis, Armenian architect Nishan Yaubyan and Enis Kortan was the Sakarya Hukumet Konak (or Local Government building of Sakarya) which finished in 1956.

References 

Living people
Ethnic Armenian architects
Turkish people of Armenian descent
Turkish architects
Year of birth missing (living people)